Medicine Bag is the fifth solo studio album by American rapper Anybody Killa. It was released on October 19, 2010 via Psychopathic Records in three different versions, each featuring two different bonus tracks. Recording sessions took place at the Lotus Pod in Detroit. Production was primarily handled by Brian Kuma, except for several bonus tracks produced by Eric Davie. It features guest appearances from Axe Murder Boyz, Blaze Ya Dead Homie and Insane Clown Posse.

The album peaked at No. 117 on the Billboard 200, No. 18 on the Top R&B/Hip-Hop Albums, No. 12 on the Top Rap Albums and No. 15 on the Independent Albums in the United States.

Production
Anybody Killa began working on a concept album entitled Possessed, which was later scrapped in favor of this album.

AllMusic's David Jeffries compared the album's musical style to Cypress Hill, Funkdoobiest and Mike E. Clark, stating that on Medicine Bag "ABK reveals himself as one of Psychopathic's more talented artists".

Track listing

Personnel
James "Anybody Killa" Lowery – main artist, lyricist, producer
James "Young Wicked" Garcia – featured artist (track 6)
Michael "Bonez Dubb" Garcia – featured artist (track 6)
Chris "Blaze Ya Dead Homie" Rouleau – featured artist (track 9)
Joseph "Violent J" Bruce – featured artist (track 13)
Joseph "Shaggy 2 Dope" Utsler – featured artist (track 13), cuts
Andrew Montessi – vocals
Corporal Robinson – vocals
DJ Fillin – vocals
Jaime Brady – vocals
Leah Stalker – vocals
Michelle "Sweet Sugar Slam" Rapp – vocals
Strict 9 – vocals
DJ Clay – vocals, cuts
Brian Kuma – vocals, programming, producer, mixing, engineering
Eric Davie – vocals, programming, producer, engineering assistant
Sam Blake – guitar
Joey V – guitar
Steven Razorblade – guitar
Leonard Contreras – programming, producer
Jim Kissling – mastering

Charts

References

External links

2010 albums
Anybody Killa albums
Psychopathic Records albums